The European Audiovisual Observatory is a public service organisation, part of the Council of Europe set up  in 1992.

The observatory collects and analyses data about the audiovisual industry in Europe, such as cinema, television, radio, video, Video On Demand and Catch-up TV.

The observatory's headquarters are located in the  Villa Schutzenberger in Strasbourg.

Lumiere (database)
Lumiere (stylized as LUMIERE)  is an online database of ticket sales for films released in 27 European territories, created in cooperation with national information sources and the MEDIA Programme of the European Union.

References

External links
  Lumiere

1992 establishments in France
Organizations established in 1992
Cultural organizations based in France
Council of Europe
European cinema
Organizations based in Strasbourg
Online databases